The Best of David Bowie 1980/1987 is a compilation album by English singer-songwriter David Bowie. The CD was originally released by EMI as part of The Platinum Collection in 2005/2006. The 2007 release is part of EMI's two-disc Sight & Sound series, each of which features a CD and DVD of material from the same artist. The DVD portion of the collection features two videos previously unreleased on DVD - "When the Wind Blows" and "The Drowned Girl".

Track listing
All songs written by David Bowie, except where noted.

CD

DVD

Chart performance

References

David Bowie video albums
David Bowie compilation albums
2007 greatest hits albums
2007 video albums
Music video compilation albums
EMI Records compilation albums
EMI Records video albums
Virgin Records compilation albums